Rostaq (also Romanized as Rostāq; also known as Rastagh, Rowstāq, and Rustāq) is a village in Moqam Rural District, Shibkaveh District, Bandar Lengeh County, Hormozgan Province, Iran. At the 2006 census, its population was 679, in 133 families.

References 

Populated places in Bandar Lengeh County